In logic, a metavariable (also metalinguistic variable or syntactical variable) is a symbol or symbol string which belongs to a metalanguage and stands for elements of some object language. For instance, in the sentence

Let A and B be two sentences of a language ℒ

the symbols A and B are part of the metalanguage in which the statement about the object language ℒ is formulated.

John Corcoran considers this terminology unfortunate because it obscures the use of schemata and because such "variables" do not actually range over a domain.

The convention is that a metavariable is to be uniformly substituted with the same instance in all its appearances in a given schema. This is in contrast with nonterminal symbols in formal grammars where the nonterminals on the right of a production can be substituted by different instances.

Attempts to formalize the notion of metavariable result in some kind of type theory.

See also
Explicit substitution

Notes

References
 
 
 
 

Logic symbols
Metalogic
Syntax (logic)
Variables (mathematics)